In Bangladesh an MP Hostel is a residential building where member of the parliament can live  there individually or with his family.
In Tejgaon area of Dhaka city there was an MP Hostel during Pakistan Regime, it is located in West Nakhalpara.

Recent Bangladeshi Governments have made new MP Hostels in Sher-e-Bangla Nagor area and in Nakhalpara.

References 

Buildings and structures in Dhaka
Residential buildings in Bangladesh
Government buildings in Bangladesh